A torch is a portable burning light source.

Torch or torches may also refer to:

Places
 Torch, Missouri, a community in the United States
 Torch, Ohio, a community in the United States
  The Marina Torch, a residential skyscraper in Dubai

People
 Torch (American rapper), an American rapper
 Torch (German rapper), a German rapper
 Warren DeMartini, nicknamed "Torch", a guitarist for the American hard rock band Ratt
 Sidney Torch, a British composer and bandleader
 Robert Torricelli, a U.S. Senator from New Jersey nicknamed "the Torch"

Arts, entertainment, and media

Fictional entities
 Torch (G.I. Joe), a character in the G.I. Joe universe
 Torch, a human replacement entity utilized in the world of Shakugan no Shana novels
 Human Torch, the Fantastic Four comic book character

Music

Songs
  Torch (Carly Simon album), a 1981 album by Carly Simon
 Torch (Honeytribe album), a 2006 album by Devon Allman's Honeytribe
 "Torch" (song), a 1982 song by British pop duo Soft Cell
  "Torch", the ending song for the anime Clannad
 "Torch", a 2007 song by American rock duo Pinback from their album Autumn of the Seraphs
 "The Torch" (Elgar), a song by the English composer Edward Elgar
 "The Torch", a song by Scottish musician Momus from the album Scobberlotchers

Other uses in music
Torch (band), a Norwegian rock metal band
 "Torch song", a type of love song
 Torches (album), the debut album by Foster the People

Print media
 Torch (novel), a 2007 novel by American author Cheryl Strayed
 The Torch (novel), a 1948 science fiction novel by Jack Bechdolt
 The Torch (St. John's University), student newspaper
 TORCH report, a written report on the Chernobyl disaster

Other uses in arts, entertainment, and media
 Torch (juggling), a prop used by jugglers
 The Torch (film), a 1950 film directed by Emilio Fernández
 "Torches", an episode of the television series Teletubbies

Computing and technology
 Torch (browser), a freeware Web browser and Internet suite developed by Torch Media
 Torch (machine learning), a library of machine learning algorithms
 BlackBerry Torch, a smartphone
 Torch Computers, former manufacturer of computers

Tools
 Torch, or flashlight, a portable hand-held electric light
 Blowtorch, fuel-burning metalworking tool used for applying flame and heat
 Oxyacetylene torch, see Oxy-fuel welding and cutting

Other uses 
 Operation Torch, the Anglo-American invasion of French North Africa in World War II during the North African Campaign
 TORCH, The Oxford Research Centre in the Humanities
 TORCH complex (aka TORCHES), a healthcare mnemonic for maternal infections transmitted to the fetus
 TORCH syndrome, a cluster of symptoms caused by congenital infection

See also
Torched (disambiguation)